is the name of two train stations in Japan:

 Ōtani Station (Shiga)
 Ōtani Station (Wakayama)